Tecolote Road station is a San Diego Trolley station in San Diego, California. The station is located adjacent to the 5 Freeway/Tecolote Road interchange. It was developed as a station for the Mid-Coast Trolley extension project, which is an extension for the Blue Line. The station has 279 parking spaces.

Station layout 
There are two tracks, each served by a side platform.

References 

Blue Line (San Diego Trolley)
San Diego Trolley stations in San Diego
Railway stations in the United States opened in 2021